Community Place, in Skaneateles, New York, was built in 1830. It was photographed by the Historic American Buildings Survey in 1963 and was listed on the National Register of Historic Places in 1979.

It was a relatively successful Fourierist commune for three years, Skaneateles Community.

It is now known as Frog Pond.

It is located south of Skaneateles Falls, New York, at 680 Sheldon Road.

Gallery

References

External links

National Register of Historic Places in Onondaga County, New York
Historic American Buildings Survey in New York (state)
Utopian communities in the United States
Houses completed in 1830
Houses in Onondaga County, New York
1830 establishments in New York (state)
Populated places on the National Register of Historic Places